Fröttstädt is a railway station situated in Fröttstädt in the German state of Thuringia. It is situated on the Bebra to Erfurt main line, with another line branching off to Friedrichroda.

A unique feature of the station is its warm water supply - the water is provided by a nearby residential building, using surplus boiler capacity.

References

Railway stations in Thuringia
Buildings and structures in Gotha (district)